Prajapathi is a 2006 Malayalam-language action drama film directed by Ranjith. The film stars Mammootty, Siddique, Sreenivasan, Aditi Rao Hydari, Sandhya, Seema, Nedumudi Venu and Sai Kumar. The music is by Tej Manoj and lyrics are by Girish Puthencherry. The film was shot close to Gopichettipalayam in Tamil Nadu.

Plot 
Devar Madom Narayanan is accused of killing his father, for being cruel to his mother, at the age of 13 and serves a sentence in a juvenile home. When he returns, he becomes leader of the people of Perumalpuram village. He ensures the village is devoid of all wrongdoers by expelling them. His enemies are his uncle Kunjambu Nair and wife Indrani. Kunjambu Nair hated Narayanan killing his brother, although Kunjambu Nair and his son Giri tried in many ways to kill Narayanan. At one point Giri almost succeeded in killing Devar madom Narayanan. Narayanan again did not react. He was on good terms with Kunjambu Nair's daughter and his Murapennu. Giri tries to sell his land in Perumalpuram to some outsider whose arrival, Narayanan knew, would destroy the harmony of the village. That is when Narayanan decides to react.

It turns out that Kunjambu Nair was the one who actually killed his father for their wealth. Narayanan helps Ali Raghavan, the real son of Kunjambu Nair, to gain his birthright. When Giri finds that he is the stepson of Kunjambu Nair, he kills his stepfather. The family drives him away from home with the help of Narayanan. The rest of the film is about how and if Giri takes revenge on Narayanan.

Cast 

 Mammootty as Adv. Devarmadom Narayanan (Unni Thamburan)
 Siddique as Kaliyarmadom Giri
 Sreenivasan as Aali Raghavan
 Nedumudi Venu as Kunjambu Nair
 Aditi Rao Hydari as Savithri
 Sandhya as Vasanthi, daughter of Kunjambu Nair
 Thilakan as Vellodi, Narayanan's advisor
 Sai Kumar as MLA Kuttykrishanan
 Seema as Indrani, Kunjambu Nair's wife
 Abu Salim as Krishnankutty, Narayanan's driver
 Sadiq as Latheef, Perumalpuram villager and Narayanan's ally
 Ajith Kollam as Kunjachan, Perumalpuram villager and Narayanan's ally
 Maniyanpilla Raju as Kumaran, Giri's assistant
 Kanya Bharathi as Devaki, Kumaran's wife
 Bheeman Raghu as SP Ramachandran IPS, an honest police officer
 Augustine as Ravuthar, Narayanan's accountanant
 Kunchan as Nambiar
 Jayan Cherthala as Jagathan, Kunjambu Nair's second son
 T. P. Madhavan as Appa swami
 Vijayan Karanthoor as Rajappan, Perumalpuram villager and Narayanan's ally
 K.V. Manjulan as Vijayan, Kunjambu Nair's son
 Bineesh Kodiyeri as Santhosh, Kunjambu Nair's son
 Daisy Bopanna as cine actress
 Rekha as Narayanan's mother
 Anil Murali as Peethambaran
 T. G. Ravi as Velappan Mooshari, Kuttykrishnan's father
 Salim Kumar as Power Star Manohar/ Manoharan Kumbalangi
 V. K. Sreeraman as Gangadhara Menon, Savithri's uncle
 Madhupal as Vijayan, Film Director
 Baburaj as C.I. Salim
 Ponnambalam as Vanangamudi
 Rajesh Hebbar as Chellappan, Assistant Director
 Kalabhavan Rahman as S.I. Basheer
 Santha Devi 
 Aravind Akash as Dance master
 Ambika Mohan as Radhika, MLA's Wife
 Vijayan Peringode as Nambiyar 
 TS Raju as Govindan, Narayanan's father
 Jyarajan Kozhikode

Reception 
The film received negative reviews from critics.

Soundtrack 
The film's soundtrack contains five songs, all composed by Thej Mervin, with lyrics by Gireesh Puthenchery.

References

External links 
 

2006 films
2000s Malayalam-language films
Films directed by Ranjith
Indian action drama films
Films shot in Tamil Nadu
Films shot in Coimbatore
Films shot in Pollachi
2006 action films